Marie Eleonore von Brandenburg (1607-1675) was regent of the Holy Roman Empire's county of Palatinate-Simmern-Kaiserslautern from 1655 to 1658.

On December 4, 1631, she married Count Palatine Ludwig Philipp von Simmern (1602–1655), a brother of the Bohemian Winter King Friedrich von der Pfalz, in Cölln an der Spree.

In the spring of 1632, after the liberation by the Swedes, the couple was able to move to the Palatinate. Ludwig Philipp acted as the administrator of the Electoral Palatinate, but was expelled again in 1635 by imperial troops. Marie Eleonore and her husband lived in exile in Metz and Sedan for a few years.

After Ludwig Philipp's death in 1655, his nephew Karl Ludwig claimed guardianship of Palatinate-Simmern-Kaiserslautern. However, Marie Eleonore, described as energetic, resisted these efforts with the support of her grandnephew, Elector Friedrich Wilhelm von Brandenburg, and asserted her regency.

Holy Roman Emperor Ferdinand III confirmed her on July 6, 1655 as regent of the principality, pending the adulthood of her child, the next count after her husband. Marie Eleonore resided in Kaiserslautern.

In 1658, her child, Ludwig Heinrich, turned 18 and her regency ended. Ludwig Heinrich was the count till 1674.

She survived all of her children, and Ludwig Heinrich had no children. This ended the Palatinate-Simmern line.

References

People of the Holy Roman Empire
1607 births
1675 deaths
Palatinate nobility